Louisa Jane McDonnell, Countess of Antrim, VA (née Grey; 15 February 1855, St. James's Palace – 2 April 1949) was a British noblewoman and courtier.

Lady Antrim was the daughter of Hon. Charles Grey (a son of the 2nd Earl Grey and Private Secretary to Prince Albert) and his wife, Caroline Eliza née Farquhar. She married in the Chapel Royal at St. James's Palace on 1 June 1875 the 6th Earl of Antrim (thus becoming the Countess of Antrim). They had three children:

Lady Sybil Mary McDonnell (26 March 1876 – 16 April 1959), married Vivian Smith, 1st Baron Bicester.
Randal McDonnell, 7th Earl of Antrim (10 December 1878 – 15 June 1932).
Hon. Angus McDonnell (7 June 1881 – 22 April 1966).

In 1890, the Countess became a Lady of the Bedchamber to Queen Victoria, serving until the latter's death in January 1901. She was reappointed under Queen Alexandra one month later, serving until Edward VII's death in 1910. As a lady of the court, the countess often accompanied the Queen to official engagements, and served in waiting on the Queen at one of the royal palaces for scheduled months.

The Countess of Antrim died in 1949, aged 94.

References

1855 births
1949 deaths
Ladies of the Royal Order of Victoria and Albert
Irish countesses
Ladies of the Bedchamber
Court of Queen Victoria